Scott Harris Lenet is an American venture capitalist and entrepreneur. He is a co-founder of two venture capital firms: the corporate venture capital firm Touchdown Ventures and the seed stage venture capital firm DFJ Frontier.

Career

Early career 

Lenet began his venture capital career in 1992 at Geocapital Partners, where he was the first Associate and had responsibilities for fundraising, deal sourcing, and due diligence. While at Geocapital Partners, he worked on several successful investments including Netcom, an internet service provider which completed an IPO in 1994, and Logic Works, which went public prior to being purchased by Platinum Technology and Computer Associates.  He also worked on the IPO of Catalina (formerly known as Catalina Marketing).

Beginning in 1996, Lenet worked for First Virtual Holdings, Inc., one of the first three companies offering internet payment systems.  Lenet helped write the company's S-1 registration statement for its initial public offering.  Following business school at the Wharton School of the University of Pennsylvania, he worked in product marketing at Trilogy Software in Austin, Texas, where he was responsible for launching the electronic commerce procurement product BuyingChain.  The enterprise software solution won awards at the 1998 Internet Commerce Expo and the 1999 Spring Internet World. BuyingChain was also awarded Infoworld's Ecommerce Product of the Year for 1999.

Subsequent to Trilogy, Lenet co-founded SmartFrog.com, the first cash back rewards program for online shopping.  He served as the company's Chief Executive Officer and sold the business to Cybergold in 1999.  He joined Cybergold as Vice President of Business Development, where he was responsible for startup investments and M&A, and helped manage the sale of the company to MyPoints.

DFJ Frontier 

In 2002, Lenet co-founded DFJ Frontier with David Cremin and DFJ. 

He led DFJ Frontier's investments in and served on the boards of AudioMicro (acquired by Zealot Networks), Ninth Decimal (formerly known as Jiwire and sold to InMarket), Netpulse (sold to eGym), Seismic Games (sold to Niantic), MaxPreps (sold to CBS Sports); Lipomics Technologies, (sold to Tethys Bioscience); Delve Networks, (sold to Limelight Networks - Nasdaq:LLNW); World of Good (sold to eBay - Nasdaq:EBAY), and Unsubscribe, (sold to TrustedID). Lenet also led DFJ Frontier’s investment in Synthetic Genomics and served as a board observer of Prolacta Bioscience.  He has also served on the boards of DigitalPath Networks, BondMart, Dragnet Solutions, GameSalad, SkyGrid, and Super Heat Games.

He also led and currently manages DFJ Frontier’s investment in BOOM! Studios.

Touchdown Ventures 

In 2014, Lenet co-founded Touchdown Ventures with David Horowitz and Rich Grant.

Touchdown partners with leading corporations to launch and manage their venture capital programs. Touchdown manages the complete lifecycle of a corporation’s venture capital activities, from strategy and formation to investment management.

At Touchdown, Lenet has led the creation or management of more than fifteen corporate venture capital or strategic investing programs, including 20th Century Fox, Avery Dennison, Edelman, INX, Kellogg, Macerich, Olympus, Scotts Miracle-Gro, Technicolor, and others.  He currently serves on the investment committees of Avery Dennison, Cooperative Ventures, and INX. 

Lenet currently serves on the board of directors of BOOM! Studios, a leading independent comic book company, and he also serves as an observer on the boards of directors of Invoy, a connected healthcare diagnostic company, and Gauzy, an Israeli company that makes switchable film for “smart glass” applications.

Educational roles 

Lenet began teaching venture capital and entrepreneurship by guest lecturing at Syracuse University's graduate program in Law, Technology, and Management starting in 1993. He served on the Advisory Board of the Entrepreneurship Center at the UC Davis Graduate School of Management, where he was also an Adjunct Professor from 2003 to 2010. Together with Andrew Hargadon, Lenet co-founded the UC Davis Center for Entrepreneurship and developed curriculum funded by the Kauffman Foundation. He previously served as a Director of UC Davis Connect. Beginning in 2010, Lenet began teaching venture capital as an adjunct professor at the University of Southern California Marshall School of Business and is also a frequent lecturer on venture capital and entrepreneurship for the USC Stevens Institute for Innovation. Lenet also began teaching corporate innovation at UCLA Anderson in 2018, where he is a visiting professor.  He has guest lectured at colleges and universities across North America and in Europe and is a frequent guest speaker for the National Association of Corporate Directors.

Lenet holds an A.B. in Comparative Literature from Princeton University, where he co-founded the school's astronomy club with Eric Tilenius, a former venture capitalist and founder of Netcentives, a competitor to Cybergold and MyPoints. He also received an M.B.A. in Entrepreneurial Management from The Wharton School of the University of Pennsylvania. At Wharton, he co-founded the school's technology club and chaired the school's first Internet technology conference, "Business + the Internet" in 1997. He was also teaching assistant for Marketing 101 to undergraduates and for Wharton’s Management 652 MBA class on leadership and teamwork. Lenet attended the Pennsylvania Governor's School for the Sciences at Carnegie Mellon University in the summer of 1986, prior to his senior year of high school.

He has written or edited more than 100 articles on corporate innovation and venture capital for Touchdown’s Risky Business digital publication.  He is also a contributor to TechCrunch and Forbes. Lenet previously authored a column entitled "Something Ventured" to educate entrepreneurs about venture capital. The column appeared in the Sacramento Business Journal and on the DFJ Frontier web site. He has also authored articles for the NACD Directorship magazine, Global Corporate Venturing, and AlwaysOn.

Non-profit work 
Lenet currently serves on the advisory board of the Kenley Jansen Foundation. He previously served on the boards of the Sacramento Philharmonic Orchestra, the advisory board for the Dean of the College of Biological Sciences at UC Davis, and SARTA, a non-profit dedicated to helping entrepreneurs in the Sacramento region. While earning his MBA, he founded Wharton Tech Corps, a non-profit volunteer infrastructure to improve K-12 education through technology.

Personal life 

Lenet lives in Los Angeles and has two children.

Lenet is the grandson of Fred Silberstein, an educator who was the Chief Censor at the Nuremberg Trials while serving in the United States Army during World War II. He is the son of Michael Lenet, the founder of Shadow Broadcast Services (a subsidiary of Westwood One), the first on air traffic reporting service, founded in 1975.

Lenet is the great-nephew of Benny Bass, an American boxer and International Boxing Hall of Fame inductee.

Notes

External links 
Biography - Frontier Venture Capital

American venture capitalists
Living people
Wharton School of the University of Pennsylvania alumni
Businesspeople from Philadelphia
Princeton University alumni
University of California, Davis faculty
University of Southern California faculty
Year of birth missing (living people)